Abiel is a given name. Notable people with the given name include:

Abiel (biblical figure), two minor biblical figures
Abiel Abbot (1770–1828), American clergyman
Abiel Chandler (1777–1851), American merchant
Abiel Foster (1735–1806), American clergyman and politician
Abiel Holmes (1763–1837), American clergyman and historian
Abiel Leonard (1848–1903), American Anglican bishop
Abiel Abbot Low (1811–1893), American entrepreneur, businessman, trader and philanthropist
Abiel Wood (1772–1834), American politician

See also
Abeel

Masculine given names